Lis Jensen (born 1952 in Kås) is a Danish social worker and former member of the European Parliament for the People's Movement against the EU.

She was a member of the social affairs committee in the European Parliament and her political motive was fear of how European Union legislation could affect the Danish welfare state and unions

References

1952 births
Living people
Euroscepticism in Denmark
People's Movement against the EU MEPs
20th-century women MEPs for Denmark
MEPs for Denmark 1994–1999